This is a list of the preserved Colonial churches in Mexico City, the capital of Mexico. 

Aside from being a notable city in colonial times, the city grew in the 20th century enormously in terms of population, adhering to over a hundred of suburbs close to the city (former suburbs today called "pueblos originarios" or "colonias"). This is why the churches of the colonial city are only those located in the center, the rest of the churches listed are also colonial but of former suburbs, today parts of the city.

Mexico City is home to the first and oldest European school of higher learning in the Americas, the same building was the first major school of interpreters and translators in the New World (Colegio de Santa Cruz de Tlatelolco); also the main pilgrimage site in the Americas (Basilica of Our Lady of Guadalupe), both are included in this list.

Criteria

The list only includes Colonial-era places of Christian worship, and the list does not include the Greater Mexico City churches outside Mexico City; only include within the 16 boroughs (alcaldías) of Mexico City proper. The list is ordered by the groundbreaking date of each church.

These churches are protected real estates that are heritage of the nation, and are declared as such in the Public Register of Monuments and Archaeological Zones of the Instituto Nacional de Antropología e Historia (INAH), in accordance with the Federal law on monuments and archaeological, artistic and historical zones of Mexico.

Buildings in the Historic center of Mexico City, Xochimilco and Central University City Campus of the UNAM are World Heritage Sites by UNESCO.

List

See also
List of colonial non-religious buildings in Mexico City
Atrial cross
List of archaeological sites in Mexico City

References

 
Mexico City
Colonial
History of Mexico City

Mexico
Mexico City